Motta is a small town in Val Poschiavo, Grisons, Switzerland. It is on the south side of Lago di Poschiavo.

Towns in Val Poschiavo